Anuar Francisco Guerrero Olmos (born 3 April 1979), known as Anuar Guerrero, is a Colombian football forward, who currently plays for América de Cali in the Copa Mustang.

Notes

External links

1979 births
Living people
Colombian footballers
Categoría Primera A players
Unión Magdalena footballers
Boyacá Chicó F.C. footballers
Millonarios F.C. players
Patriotas Boyacá footballers
América de Cali footballers
Association football defenders
People from Santa Marta
Sportspeople from Magdalena Department